Sergei Evgenievich Alexandrov (born April 29, 1978) is a Kazakhstani ice hockey forward who was a member of the Kazakhstan men's national ice hockey team at the 2006 Winter Olympics.

Career statistics

Regular season and playoffs

International

References

1978 births
Living people
Sportspeople from Tashkent
Ice hockey players at the 2006 Winter Olympics
Kazakhstani ice hockey left wingers
Olympic ice hockey players of Kazakhstan
Asian Games gold medalists for Kazakhstan
Asian Games silver medalists for Kazakhstan
Medalists at the 1999 Asian Winter Games
Medalists at the 2003 Asian Winter Games
Medalists at the 2007 Asian Winter Games
Ice hockey players at the 1999 Asian Winter Games
Ice hockey players at the 2003 Asian Winter Games
Ice hockey players at the 2007 Asian Winter Games
Asian Games medalists in ice hockey